Belgium competed at the 1988 Summer Paralympics in Seoul, South Korea. 54 competitors from Belgium won 41 medals including 15 gold, 18 silver and 8 bronze and finished 17th in the medal table.

See also 
 Belgium at the Paralympics
 Belgium at the 1988 Summer Olympics

References 

1988
1988 in Belgian sport
Nations at the 1988 Summer Paralympics